The 1956 United States presidential election in Colorado took place on November 6, 1956, as part of the 1956 United States presidential election. State voters chose six representatives, or electors, to the Electoral College, who voted for president and vice president.

Colorado was won by incumbent President Dwight D. Eisenhower (R–Pennsylvania), running with Vice President Richard Nixon, with 59.49% of the popular vote, against Adlai Stevenson (D–Illinois), running with Senator Estes Kefauver, with 39.81% of the popular vote.

Results

Results by county

Notes

References

Colorado
1956
1956 Colorado elections